Searching Tonight for Answers is the second album by Rides Again. The album includes the first version of the song, "Bury Your Own", longer than the version included on the band's third album Into Existence. It also includes an earlier version of "Free Fall" that is included on demo EP Wonder Why.

Track listing
Bury Your Own – 4:21
How It Feels – 3:47
Free Fall - 3:12
Yours – 3:56
Searching Tonight for Answers – 3:34
Operator – 4:11

Bury Your Own
The wailing in "Bury Your Own" on the album, Into Existence, is used as secondary sound. In this album, the track includes wailing as part of the vocals. The guitar solo at the end of the song is also longer on this album compared to Into Existence.

2006 EPs
Hollowick albums